Marin Niculescu (4 March 1923 – 2 May 2014) was a Romanian cyclist. He competed in the individual and team road race events at the 1952 Summer Olympics and placed 41st and 12th, respectively. Niculescu won the Tour of Romania in 1951 and two stages of the Tour de Pologne in 1949, placing second overall.

References

External links
 

1923 births
2014 deaths
Romanian male cyclists
Olympic cyclists of Romania
Cyclists at the 1952 Summer Olympics
Sportspeople from Bucharest